Ostrogozhsk is a town and the administrative center of Ostrogozhsky District in Voronezh Oblast, Russia, located on the Tikhaya Sosna River (a tributary of the Don),  south of Voronezh, the administrative center of the oblast. As of the 2021 Census, its population was 32,520.

History
Ostogozhsk is a historical center of Eastern Sloboda Ukraine. It was established in 1652 by Belgorod Voivode Fedor Arsenyev and Cossack Ivan Zevkovsky (or Dzenkovsky) as Ostogozhsk (little fortress) bringing along some 2,000 resettlers from Chernigov and Nezhin Regiments around an ostrog (fortress) of the Belgorod Defensive Line of Russia.

During the time of Stepan Razin's revolt against Aleksey Mikhailovich of Russia the city was under control of rebellious Cossacks.

In 1696 Peter the Great stopped at Ostrogozhsk to meet with the Hetman of Zaporizhian Host Ivan Mazepa and Cossacks of Ostrogozhsk regiment. At the Ostrogozhsk city square is located a memorial commemorating the event.

In 1708 Ostogozhsk was incorporated into the Azov Governorate.

In 1724 the Russians that were living in Ostrogozhsk, who were referred to as "people of posad" by the local inhabitants moved to Korotoyak and the Ukrainian Cossacks that lived in Korotoyak moved to Ostrogozhsk.

The town served as the headquarters of a Sloboda Ukrainian Cossack territorial and military regiment until the 1760s when it was abolished by Catherine II. In 1765 the city Ostrogozhsk was incorporated into newly established the Sloboda Ukraine Governorate. In 1802 the city of Ostrogozhsk ended up in the new Voronezh Governorate and same year it was granted the town rights. Since then the city became a center of the split East Sloboda Ukraine.

According to the 1897 Russian census there were 51,4 % of Little Russians (Ukrainians) in the town of Ostogozhsk and 46,8 % of Great Russians (Russians). The inhabitants of the town continued to preserve their Ukrainian customs and Cossack traditions well into the twentieth century and their remains a district of the town named 'majdan'.

In 1918 the town was controlled by Ukrainian People's Republic and the Ukrainian Hetmanate. From 1919 the town was controlled by Anton Denikin's White Armee of South Russia. In 1920, Ostrogozhsk became a part of Soviet Russia, while borders between the Soviet Russia and the Soviet Ukraine were not finalized until 1925. According to the census of 1926, ethnic Ukrainians accounted for 74.1 percent of the town's and 69.6 percent of the county's inhabitants. In 1928 Ostrogozhsk became a district's administrative center within what now is Voronezh Oblast. The town was occupied by Nazi Germany during World War II from July 5, 1942 (during the Battle of Voronezh) to January 20, 1943, when it was liberated in the course of the Ostrogozhsk–Rossosh Offensive.

Administrative and municipal status
Within the framework of administrative divisions, Ostrogozhsk serves as the administrative center of Ostrogozhsky District. As an administrative division, it is, together with six rural localities in Ostrogozhsky District, incorporated within Ostrogozhsky District as Ostrogozhsk Urban Settlement. As a municipal division, this administrative unit also has urban settlement status and is a part of Ostrogozhsky Municipal District.

Notable people
 Alexander Iovsky (1796—1857), Russian chemist and pharmacist
 Ivan Kramskoi (1837—1887), Russian painter
 Lev Solovyev (1837—1919), Russian painter
 Elisabeth Milicyna (1869—1930), Russian writer
 Eduard Steinberg (1882—1935), Russian painter 
 Pavel Fedoseenko (1898—1934), Soviet aeronaut
 , Soviet Russian sniper
 Veniamin Gaydukov, Soviet Russian lieutenant-general

References

Notes

Sources

External links
Unofficial website of Ostrogozhsk 
History of Ostrogozhsk  
History of Ostrogozhsk in the 19th–20th centuries 

Cities and towns in Voronezh Oblast
Populated places in Ostrogozhsky District
Ostrogozhsky Uyezd